Sleeping Beauty Mountain (also known as Mount Patukan, Mount Mating-oy Dinayao, Mount Mantingoy) is a mountain ridge in Kalinga province of the Philippines. The mountain is called as such because the silhouette of the northern ridge resembles a sleeping woman.  It is usually best viewed from the west near the municipality Tinglayan in the Chico River valley, but it can also be viewed from the east near Tanudan.

Mount Patukan (in the Lubo dialect of Tanudan) is the forehead and highest point of 'Sleeping Beauty.'  The ridge is located between the municipalities of Tanudan and Tinglayan.  The mountain is known as Mount Mating-oy Dinayao in the Tinglayan dialect.

The Legend of Sleeping Beauty
There is a folkloric legend regarding the mountain, passed on for several generations.  The tale is one of Kalinga’s most loved bedtime stories popularly sang in the native ballad called Ullalim.  The tale of two lovers ended by a tribal war has different versions, depending on the tribe where the story originated, the name of the protagonists are different, but with only slight variation in the story. One version of the story is about Lubting and Mawanga; one, about Dinayao and Binsay; and the other, Edonsan and Banna - all ending with the female protagonist resting on Patukan, in despair, after the loss of her loved one.

See also
The Sleeping Lady

References

External links
Climbing 'Mount Patukan/Mt. Mating-oy Dinayao' from Pinoy Mountaineer
"Patukan:The Legend of the 'Sleeping Beauty' The Story of Lubting and Mawanga from Call of Nature
"Love Immortalized in Mt. Patukan (The Sleeping Beauty of Mt. Mating-oy) - Dinayao and Binsay" from Cordillera Express
"The Legend of the Sleeping Beauty". The Story of Edonsan and Banna from the Kalinga Mountaineering Society.

Landforms of Kalinga (province)
Ridges of Asia
Mountains of the Philippines